Anaís Méndez (born 18 January 2000) is an Ecuadorian Paralympic athlete. She along with her elder sister Poleth Isamar Mendes Sanchez claimed the first medals for Ecuador in the history of the Paralympics. Both have the unique distinction of being the only siblings combination to be the first two Paralympic medalists for a country.

Career 
She made her maiden Paralympic appearance representing Ecuador at the 2016 Summer Paralympics.

She clinched bronze medal in the women's F20 shot put event during the 2020 Summer Paralympics. Coincidentally, her sister Poleth Isamar Mendes Sanchez won the gold medal in the same discipline making it a rare instance of athletes coming from same family who go on to win medals in a same competition. Anaís Méndez won Ecuador's first ever bronze medal in Paralympics history while her elder sister Poleth Isamar Mendes Sanchez won Ecuador's first ever gold medal in Paralympics history. Prior to the 2020 Summer Paralympics, Ecuador had never won a Paralympic medal.

References 

2000 births
Living people
Ecuadorian female shot putters
Paralympic bronze medalists for Ecuador
Athletes (track and field) at the 2016 Summer Paralympics
Athletes (track and field) at the 2020 Summer Paralympics
Paralympic athletes of Ecuador
Paralympic medalists in athletics (track and field)
Medalists at the 2020 Summer Paralympics
21st-century Ecuadorian women